Luoshuidong railway station may refer to:
 Luoshuidong railway station (Hubei), on the Yichang−Wanzhou Railway in Hubei, China
 Luoshuidong railway station (Yunnan), in Mengzi, Yunnan, China.